Westburg Township is one of sixteen townships in Buchanan County, Iowa, USA.  As of the 2010 census, its population was 513.

Geography 

References

External links 

 US-Counties.com
 City-Data.com

Townships in Buchanan County, Iowa
Townships in Iowa